"Sweettalk My Heart" is a song by Swedish singer-songwriter Tove Lo. It was released as the fifth single off of her fourth studio album, Sunshine Kitty, on 18 September 2019 for digital download and streaming. It is an electropop composition with influences of dancehall music. Upon release, the song received positive reviews from music critics, who complimented its production and lyrics. It received a music video, as well as a lyric video.

Background 
According to Lo, "Sweettalk My Heart" was "the first song [she] wrote where [she] felt, 'Am I making my fourth album right now? Is this where it’s going to go?'". The track was recorded at MXM Studios in Los Angeles, USA, and Stockholm, Sweden, as well as Jack & Coke Studios and House Mouse Studios, both in Stockholm.

Composition and lyrics 
"Sweettalk My Heart" is a "softer-edged" electropop track composed in the key of E♭ minor and a tempo of 95 beats per minute. Michael Love Michael of PAPER described it as a "stylistic merge of dancehall-inflected breakbeats" and "synthesized '80s bombast". Lyrically, it discusses "love's deceptive, darker multitudes"

Critical reception 
Upon release, "Sweettalk My Heart" received positive reviews from music critics. Writers for website Scandipop considered the song a highlight on its parent album and Lo's fifth best single in her discography.

Personnel 
Credits adapted from the Sunshine Kitty CD booklet.
 Tove Lo – vocals, songwriting
 Ludvig Söderberg – songwriting
 Jakob Hazell – songwriting, production, programming, drums, bass, keys
 Svante Halldin – songwriting, production, programming, drums, bass, keys
 A Strut – production

Track listing
Digital download — Live at Vevo
"Sweettalk my Heart" (Live at Vevo) — 3:23

Digital download — Team Salut Remix
"Sweettalk my Heart" (Team Salut Remix) — 2:59

Digital download — Aazar Remix
"Sweettalk my Heart" (Aazar Remix) — 3:15

Digital download — BloodPop® & BURNS Vitaclub Remix
"Sweettalk my Heart" (BloodPop® & BURNS Vitaclub Remix) — 4:58

Digital download — Jeremy Olander Remix
"Sweettalk my Heart" (Jeremy Olander Remix) — 7:38

Charts

References 

Tove Lo songs
2019 songs
2019 singles
Electropop songs
Songs written by Tove Lo
Songs written by Ludvig Söderberg
Songs written by Jakob Hazell
Songs written by Svante Halldin